The 2007–08 Championnat National is the 15th edition of the 3rd division league and began play in August 2007 and is slated to end in May 2008. Clermont Foot, US Boulogne, and Angers SCO were promoted to Ligue 2, whereas Sporting Toulon, US Raon-l'Étape, SO Châtellerault, and AS Yzeure were relegated to the CFA.

Promoted from the CFA were Calais RUFC from Groupe A, AC Arles from Groupe B, Rodez AF from Groupe C, and Villemomble Sports from Groupe D.

20 participating teams

 AC Arles
 AS Beauvais Oise
 AS Cannes
 Calais RUFC
 AS Cherbourg Football
 US Créteil-Lusitanos
 FC Istres
 Stade Lavallois
 CS Louhans-Cuiseaux
 FC Martigues
 Nîmes Olympique
 Paris FC
 Pau FC
 Rodez AF
 SO Romorantin
 L'Entente SSG
 FC Sète
 Tours FC
 Vannes OC
 Villemomble Sports

League table

Top goalscorers
Last updated 10 May 2008

Managers

References
Official Website of The Championnat de France National
Championnat Football Statistics
Championnat National Standings

Championnat National seasons
France
3